Tut (also Romanized as Tūt) is a village in Doreh Rural District, in the Central District of Sarbisheh County, South Khorasan Province, Iran. At the 2006 census, its population was 102, in 29 families.

References 

Populated places in Sarbisheh County